Shawnee is a census-designated place (CDP) in Miami Township, Hamilton County, Ohio, United States,  west of downtown Cincinnati. The population of Shawnee was 747 at the 2020 census.

Geography
Shawnee is located in the southwest corner of the state of Ohio, occupying the land between the Ohio and Great Miami rivers. To the south is Boone County, Kentucky, and to the west is Dearborn County, Indiana.  To the north, across the Great Miami River, is Whitewater Township, and to the east are the villages of Cleves and North Bend. Much of the central heights of the CDP are taken up by Shawnee Lookout County Park. The area is also home to the Shawnee Lookout Archeological District.

Demographics

References

Census-designated places in Hamilton County, Ohio
Census-designated places in Ohio